The Château de La Brède is a feudal castle in the commune of La Brède in the département of Gironde, France.

The castle was built in the Gothic style starting in 1306, on the site of an earlier castle. It is surrounded by water-filled moats and an English garden, in the centre of a Bordelais vineyard. Despite modifications over the centuries, it has kept its character as a fortress.

The philosopher Montesquieu (1689–1755), (full title: Charles Louis de Secondat, baron de La Brède et de Montesquieu) was born, lived and wrote the majority of his works here. Visitors may see his library (though the books have been transferred to the library in Bordeaux) and his bedroom, both preserved as they were in the 18th century.

At her death in 2004, the Countess of Chabannes, a descendant of Montesquieu and last owner of the château, bequeathed her belongings, including the castle, to the Foundation named after her.

The castle is open to visitors from Easter to 11 November. It is classed by the French Ministry of Culture as a monument historique.

See also
 List of castles in France

References

External links
 Château de la Brède - official site 
 Château de La Brède on Montesquieu tourist office site 
 

Castles in Nouvelle-Aquitaine
Châteaux in Gironde
Monuments historiques of Gironde
Historic house museums in Nouvelle-Aquitaine
Museums in Gironde
Maisons des Illustres
Montesquieu